Ectropina sclerochitoni is a moth of the family Gracillariidae. It is known from Nigeria and South Africa.

The larvae feed on Sclerochiton harveyanus. They probably mine the leaves of their host plant.

References

Gracillariinae
Insects of West Africa
Moths of Africa
Moths described in 1961